Vas is a genus of moths of the family Erebidae erected by Michael Fibiger in 2010.

Species
Vas owadai Fibiger, 2010
Vas proceus Fibiger, 2010

References

Micronoctuini
Moth genera